Jugatacaris is an extinct genus of bivalved arthropod known from a single species, Jugatacaris agilis found in the Cambrian Stage 3 aged Chengjiang biota of Yunnan, China. The head has a pair of stalked eyes, as well as a dumbbell shaped medial eye between them. The head also bore a pair of mandibles as well as at least one and possibly two pairs of antennules. The trunk had up to 65 segments, each with biramous appendages. The appendages had thin endopods with 30 podomeres, each bearing a spiny endite, with the endopods ending with a terminal claw. The appendages also had overlapping flap-like exopods, which are elongated, being at maximum eight times as long as they are wide, which on their posterior edge are covered with setae. The trunk ended with a forked tail. It was likely an actively swimming filter feeder, using its constantly beating appendages to sift food from the water column, which was then passed forward along the U-shaped food groove between the appendage pairs towards the mouth. While initially placed as a crustaceanomorph, later studies considered to be a member of Hymenocarina, which contains numerous other similar bivalved Cambrian arthropods.

References 

Prehistoric arthropod genera
Cambrian arthropods
Hymenocarina
Fossil taxa described in 2021